Aleksandër Xhuvani University  is an institution of higher education located in Elbasan, Albania. It is divided into five faculties: Natural Sciences, Humanities, Economics, Educational Sciences and Medical and Technical Sciences. The current rector of the university is Prof. Dr. Skënder Topi.

History 
Aleksandër Xhuvani University is a successor institution of the "Elbasan Normal School", a teacher training institution that was founded on December 1, 1909. "Shkolla Normale" was the first school of vocational education in the Albanian language.

The first establishment of an institution of higher education in Elbasan occurred in 1971 with the founding of the Institut i Lartë Pedagogjik "Aleksandër Xhuvani" (Aleksandër Xhuvani Higher Educational Institute). This institution consisted of several teacher training departments (Albanian Language and Literature, Mathematics and Physics, History and Geography, Chemistry and Biology), as well as Engineering and Economics departments that were outposts of the University of Tirana. On November 12, 1991, the Institute became the Aleksandër Xhuvani University.

The university is named after Aleksandër Xhuvani, an Albanian philologist and educator.

Rectors 
 Vasil Kamami
 Hysen Shabanaj
 Agron Tato
 Mehmet Çeliku
 Teuta Dilo
 Jani Dode
 Liman Varoshi

See also
List of universities in Albania
List of colleges and universities by country
Qafa e Vishës bus tragedy

References

Educational institutions established in 1971
Buildings and structures in Elbasan
 
1971 establishments in Albania